Davis Township is the name of two townships in the U.S. state of Indiana:

 Davis Township, Fountain County, Indiana
 Davis Township, Starke County, Indiana

See also
Davis Township (disambiguation)

Indiana township disambiguation pages